Song Sae-byeok (born December 25, 1979) is a South Korean actor. After gaining attention as a supporting actor in The Servant (2010), Song played the leading roles in the comedies Meet the In-Laws (2011) and The Suck Up Project: Mr. XXX-Kisser (2012).

Filmography

Film

Television series

Theater

Awards and nominations

References

External links
 
 
 

21st-century South Korean male actors
South Korean male film actors
South Korean male stage actors
South Korean comedians
People from Gunsan
1979 births
Living people